Angul or Angull was a legendary Norse king who, according to the Gesta Danorum, was the ancestor of the Angles in Denmark. His father was King Humbli, probably the same as Heimdall, one of Woden's twelve diar in Sigtuna and Gamla Uppsala in Sweden.

Nordic traditions

Getica (Gothic)
Already in Jordanes' Getica, written in the 6th century, the Danes, of the same tribe as the Swedes, are said to have emigrated from Sweden to Denmark in ancient times.

Gesta Danorum (Danish)
The Gesta Danorum (13th century) continues to say that Angul had his name given to the region he governed (Angeln), and that his descendants later conquered Great Britain and substituted the new title of their own land for the island's original name (hence "Angleland" and later "England"). Angul had a brother named Dan who in like manner became the ancestor and ruler of the Danes. There are other Nordic traditions that correspond to this. While Angul is not mentioned here, his brother Dan is.

Chronicon Lethrense (Danish)
In the Chronicle of Leire (12th century), there is a King Ypper of Uppsala, whose sons were Dan, Nori, and Östen. Dan afterwards ruled Denmark, Nori afterwards ruled Norway, and Östen afterwards ruled the Swedes.

Skjöldungasaga (Danish)
According to Arngrímur Jónsson's Latin epitome of the lost Skjöldungasaga made in 1597, Rigus (or Rig, who is the same as Heimdall) had a son called Dan or Danum, whose subjects were called Danes.

Rígsþula (Icelandic)
The Eddic poem Rígsþula tells how the god Rígr (said to be Heimdall), fathered a son named Ríg-Jarl. Ríg-Jarl had eleven sons, the youngest of whom bore the name Konr the Young. One day, as he was hunting and snaring birds, a crow spoke to him and suggested he would gain more by going after men, and praised the wealth of "Dan and Danp". They are noted as the grandson and son of Rig in the Ynglinga saga. According to the lost Skjöldungasaga, Rig marries Dana, daughter of Danp, and they get Dan of the Danes.

Ynglinga saga (Norwegian)
Snorri Sturluson's Ynglinga saga (13th century) relates of King Dygvi of Sweden, that his wife was a daughter of King Danp, the son of Rig, who was first called "konungr" in the Danish tongue. She was a sister of King Dan Mikillati, from whom Denmark takes its name.

"Ballad of Eric" (Swedish)
The "Ballad of Eric" (mid-15th century) deals with Eric, the first king of Götaland. He sent a troop of Geats southward to a country named Vetala, where no one had yet cultivated the land. Later, a king named Humli sent his son Dan to rule the settlers. After Dan, Vetala was named Denmark. The Ballad of Eric is now regarded as an inauthentic piece of fakelore.

See also
 Dan
 Dan I of Denmark
 Rig
 Angeln
 Anglo-Saxons

References
 
Reconstructing Rig: The Missing Page of Rigsthula by Timothy J. Stephany
Y-DNA Haplogroup R-U152 in Britain: Proposed Link to the 5th Century Migration of the Angle and Jute Tribes from Jutland and Fyn, Denmark, by David K. Faux

Sources
 The Origin and Deeds of the Goths
 Gesta Danorum in Latin. Another version of Gesta Danorum (in Danish)
 Chronicon Lethrense (in Danish)
 Rigsthula
 Ynglinga Saga
 "Ballad of Eric"

Mythological kings of Denmark
Mythological kings of Sweden